Richard J. Keane (March 28, 1933 – October 21, 2008) was an American politician from New York

Early life
Keane was born on March 28, 1933, in Buffalo, New York.

Career 
A Democrat, Keane served as a member of the Erie County Board of Supervisors and Erie County Legislature. He was the first Democrat ever elected chairman of the Erie County Legislature.

Keane was a member of the New York State Assembly from 1977 to 1998, sitting in the 182nd, 183rd, 184th, 185th, 186th, 187th, 188th, 189th, 190th, 191st and 192nd New York State Legislatures. Keane was also a member of the Assembly Agriculture Committee.

Death 
Keane died on October 21, 2008.

References

Democratic Party members of the New York State Assembly
County legislators in New York (state)
1933 births
2008 deaths
20th-century American politicians